St Aloysius College (SAC) is a Catholic primary, secondary and post-secondary education institution run by the Euro-Mediterranean Province of the Society of Jesus in Birkirkara, Malta. It was founded by the Jesuits in 1907 to complement the seminaries and tertiary institutions already in existence on the island. Today, it comprises a coeducational primary school, boys' secondary school, and a coeducational sixth form. The College compound also houses its own church (dedicated to the Sacred Heart of Jesus) which is used by the College community and open to the public, as well as a Sports and Recreational Complex.

History
In October 1907, the Jesuits, at the request of Pope Pius X, founded St Aloysius College at Birkirkara, in the building which presently houses the Secondary school. The College opened with 64 boarders, 56 day boys, and 30 externs. Today, the student population is just over 1500.

The college was originally built in 1896 to house young Jesuits in their formative years. However, in 1905 the novices and other scholastics were transferred to Sicily and the building remained vacant for a while.

It served as a hospital for Allied soldiers during the Second World War.

Primary school 
The primary school was originally Stella Maris School, a separate school founded by the Franciscan Missionaries of Mary, and has been incorporated into the college: boys (and in the coming years also girls) can attend the school from kindergarten through to sixth form.

Students are admitted to the Primary School in Kindergarten 2 or Prep 1 through the ballot system, and move on directly to secondary education after Prep 6.

Students' council 
Established in 2016, the Primary School has its own Students' council, with elections held in October each year. Only students from Prep 3 to Prep 6 are eligible to run. The council has 15 members, with one student representing each class. The council organises various activities throughout the scholastic year and introduces new initiatives facilitated by the school administration.

Secondary school
The secondary school is located on Old Railway Road (Triq il-Ferrovija l-Qadima), Birkirkara. It is three storeys high with another storey underground, and incorporates a small inner ground and a large hall which serves as a theatre for cultural events held at the college. Such events include the Sixth Form's Soirée, the Secondary School Concert, Talent Nights, and the celebration of other feast days in the Jesuit calendar. The college celebrated its centenary in the scholastic year 2007–2008.

The theatre's stage has been refurbished, and the under-stage area has been professionally upgraded to include modern bathroom facilities, designated make-up spaces, and all-new electrical supplies.

The college is equipped with science laboratories (for physics, chemistry, and biology), computer laboratories, an engineering laboratory, a hospitality/food laboratory, as well as four chapels. The chapels are dedicated to Francis Xavier, one of the three most important Jesuit saints, with another being dedicated to the college's patron saint St. Aloysius Gonzaga and La Storta Chapel, a unique chapel in itself.

Students' council
The Secondary School has a Students' Council with members elected annually and all students eligible. It has ten members, two from each form. Its president spans fourth/fifth form. The council is responsible for most school events, including the organisation of casual days and fundraising activities, among others.

The Sports Complex 
The college's Sports and Recreational Complex includes:    

 Health and fitness centre
 11-a-side FIFA approved synthetic football pitch
 Six-lane IAAF approved athletics track
 Indoor multi-purpose pavilion for handball, volleyball, netball, basketball, badminton and futsal
Aerobics/dance studios
Physiotherapy Room
Conference Room
Cafeteria
Two outdoor tennis courts

The Sixth Form

St Aloysius College Sixth Form has been in existence for the best part of 30 years. It offers four major courses – science, maths, commerce, and arts – each requiring about two years. There are two classes in each course; three for arts. The college annually accepts around 260 new students who have passed the core O Level subjects. Facilities include biology, chemistry, physics, and computer laboratories, a media room, library, and assembly hall.

Among the many annual events hosted by the Sixth Form, its cultural Soiree in early February is most popular. It includes a variety of performing arts; dancing, acting, singing, and music; and concludes with a 45-minute musical directed and choreographed by the students themselves.

The Sixth Form students' council
The Sixth Form has its own Students' Council, with elections held in late October. Since 2012, the Council includes four students from the lower and upper years, with the president from the upper. The council is responsible for organising most Sixth Form events, and has an important say in the Soirée.

Saturday schooling
From its inception in 1907, St Aloysius College never held classes on Wednesday but instead on Saturday morning, making it the only school in Malta to do so. On October 13, 2006, a decision was made by Maltese Jesuit Provincial Paul Chetcuti and college rector Patrick Magro to replace Saturdays with Wednesdays to conform to the practice of other schools. In the view of some, this deprived St. Aloysius' College of its uniqueness.  The change took effect in September 2007, with St Aloysius' sixth form also conforming to the practice of fellow sixth forms: De La Salle College (Malta), Junior College (Msida), Giovanni Curmi Higher Secondary School (Naxxar), and the new St. Martin's College Sixth Form (Swatar - Msida) which opened in September 2007.

Extra-curricular activities
All students are encouraged to participate in extracurricular activities, which include:

 Battle of the Bands
 Subsonic
 Unplugged
 Secondary School Concert
 Charity work
 Cultural Soirée
 Model European Parliament (MEP) by Aġenżija Żgħażagħ
 NSTF Mini European Assembly
 EuroScola

 President's Award 
 Public Debating Activities (e.g., BCA Speak Your Mind competition & Science Forum)
 Young Enterprise Scheme
 Young Scientist competition
 FestAlwigi (Formerly known as SACFest)
 Music festival
 After School Sports

The college also has its own Scout group, one of the oldest established on the island, having formed in 1916.

Notable alumni
 Edward Fenech Adami - President Emeritus and former Prime Minister of Malta
 Guido de Marco - President Emeritus of Malta
 Ugo Mifsud Bonnici - President Emeritus of Malta
 Ċensu Tabone - President Emeritus of Malta
 Robert Abela - incumbent Prime Minister of Malta
 Joseph Muscat - former Prime Minister of Malta, Leader of the Labour Party, former Member of European Parliament
 Chris Fearne - incumbent Deputy Prime Minister and Minister for Health
 Tonio Borg - former Deputy Prime Minister, former Minister for Justice, Home Affairs, and Foreign Affairs, and former European Commissioner
 Mario de Marco - former Minister for Tourism, incumbent Member of Parliament in opposition
 Tonio Fenech - former Minister of Finance
 Carmelo Mifsud Bonnici - former Minister for Justice and Home Affairs, Member of Parliament in opposition
 Francis Zammit Dimech - former Minister for Tourism and Culture, Member of European Parliament
 Godfrey Farrugia - former Minister for Health and Member of Parliament
 Edward Zammit Lewis - former Minister for Justice, Minister for Tourism and Minister for European Affairs,  Labour Member of Parliament
 Christian Cardona - former Minister for the Economy, Investment and Small Businesses and Labour Party deputy leader for party affairs
 Joe Debono Grech - former Minister for Agriculture and Fisheries and Member of Parliament
 Simon Busuttil - former Leader of the Opposition and Nationalist Party Leader
 Adrian Delia - former Leader of the Opposition and Nationalist Party Leader
 Robert Arrigo - Member of Parliament, businessman, and Nationalist Party deputy leader for party affairs
 Roberta Metsola - Maltese politician, President of the European Parliament
 David J. Attard - Professor of International Law, Chancellor of the University of Malta 
 Ira Losco - singer
 Saviour Pirotta - children's books author
 Frans Sammut - Maltese writer
 Gianluca Bezzina - singer
 Davide Tucci - actor, model
 Stephen C. Spiteri - military historian
 Daphne Caruana Galizia - journalist and blogger

See also
 List of Jesuit schools

References

External links
 

Catholic schools in Malta
Sixth form colleges in Malta
Educational institutions established in 1907
Birkirkara
Malta
1907 establishments in Malta
Defunct hospitals in Malta